The 2006 Countrywide Classic was a men's tennis tournament played on outdoor hard courts at the Los Angeles Tennis Center in Los Angeles, California in the United States and was part of the International Series of the 2006 ATP Tour and of the 2006 US Open Series. It was the 80th edition of the Los Angeles Open and the tournament ran from July 24, 2006, through July 30, 2006. Prize money for the singles champion was $69,200, and the doubles champions received $23,570. Sixth-seeded Tommy Haas won the singles title, his second after 2004.

Finals

Singles

 Tommy Haas defeated  Dmitry Tursunov 4–6, 7–5, 6–3

Doubles

 Bob Bryan /  Mike Bryan defeated  Eric Butorac /  Jamie Murray 6–2, 6–4

External links 

Countrywide Classic
Los Angeles Open (tennis)
Countrywide Classic
Countrywide Classic
Countrywide Classic
Countrywide Classic